Salvatore D'Elia (born 10 February 1989) is an Italian footballer who plays as a left-back for Chieri in the Italian Serie D.

Club career

Juventus
D'Elia started his career working his way through the Juventus youth ranks since , before he made his way to the Primavera youth squad in 2007. After being promoted from the youth sector of the Turin-based club, D'Elia was sent out on loan the following season.

Loan Stints
He never managed a senior team debut with Juventus, but after graduating the youth team in July 2009, he was loaned out to third-tier club, A.S. Figline, along with teammates, Marco Duravia, Nicola Cosentini, and Alessandro D'Antoni. He made 18 appearances in his first season with the club, and returned to Juventus on 2 July 2010. D'Elia was then sent out again on loan to newly promoted Serie B outfit Portogruaro, ahead of the 2010–11 Serie B campaign, where he went on to make just 12 league appearances. On 30 June 2011, D'Elia returned to Juventus, and spent the entire 2011–12 Serie A campaign training and playing with the youth sector. Prior to the 2012–13 Serie A season, however, he was farmed out on loan to Lega Pro Prima Divisione outfit Venice.

Vicenza
On 31 January 2013 he was officially sold to Vicenza Calcio (for €400,000) along with Nicolò Corticchia (for €600,000), as part of the deal that saw Michele Cavion transfer to Juventus for €1 million. D'Elia remained on loan at Venezia until 30 June 2013. D'Elia signed a -year contract with Vicenza.

D'Elia was assigned number 3 shirt in 2014–15 season. However, in 2015–16 season the club assigned a new shirt number (number 6) to D'Elia, as the no.3 shirt was retired for former Vicenza footballer and coach, late Giulio Savoini. On 8 June 2015 D'Elia signed a new three-year contract.

On 22 December 2016 D'Elia signed a new contract again with Vicenza, which would last until 30 June 2020.

Ascoli
On 9 August 2018 he joined Serie B club Ascoli on a 3-year contract.

Frosinone
On 14 January 2020 he signed with Serie B club Frosinone.

Chieri
On 3 October 2022, D'Elia moved to Chieri in Serie D.

Career statistics

References

External links
 Football.it Profile  
 
 

Italian footballers
Juventus F.C. players
A.S.D. Portogruaro players
Venezia F.C. players
L.R. Vicenza players
S.S.C. Bari players
Ascoli Calcio 1898 F.C. players
Frosinone Calcio players
A.S.D. Calcio Chieri 1955 players
Serie B players
Serie D players
Italy youth international footballers
Association football defenders
Sportspeople from the Province of Naples
1989 births
Living people
Footballers from Campania